Dunnett is a surname. Notable people with the surname include:

Sir Alastair Dunnett (1908–1998), Scottish journalist and newspaper editor, husband of Dorothy Dunnett
Charles Dunnett (1921-2007), Canadian statistician
Dorothy Dunnett (1923–2001), Scottish historical novelist, wife of Alastair Dunnett
Jack Dunnett (1922–2019), British politician
Stephen Dunnett (born 1950), British neuroscientist
Jonathan Dunnett (born 1974), British adventurer, windsurfing the mainland coastline of Europe

See also
Dennett surname
Marvin Dunnette, American psychologist
Dunnet, village in Caithness, Scotland
Dunnet (disambiguation)